"Mork n Mindy" is a single released by the band Sleaford Mods on 30 October 2020, featuring Billy Nomates on guest vocals. The song was written in January 2020. The single is on their 2021 album Spare Ribs.

The single is accompanied by a music video directed by Ben Wheatley, uploaded by the band to YouTube on the release date. The music video has the two band members Jason Williamson and Andrew Fearn and featuring artist Billy Nomates performing the song.

The single reached the top of the UK Vinyl Singles Chart on November 27, 2020.

References

External links 
 

2020 singles
Rough Trade Records singles